HIP–Petrohemija is a Serbian petrochemical company, with the headquarters in Pančevo, Serbia.

The company owns petrochemical complexes located in Pančevo, Elemir and Crepaja. It specializes in producing HDPE, LDPE and other petrochemical products with an annual production capacity of 700,000 tonnes.

History
Petrohemija was founded in 1968 by the Government of SFR Yugoslavia. On 24 December 2021, Naftna Industrija Srbije increased its stake in HIP-Petrohemija to 90% of shares, after purchasing the majority of stakes from the Government of Serbia for 150 million euros.

Activity
HIP Petrohemija owns large petrochemical complexes located in Pančevo, Elemir and Crepaja. These complexes include a number of nine producing plants.

The ethylene plant is located in Pančevo and was established in 1979 and built by United States based company Stone & Webster and French company French Institute of Petroleum. It produces ethylene, propylene, synthetic rubber, latex, carbon black and gasoline and has an annual production capacity of around 500,000 tonnes. The high-density polyethylene (HDPE) plant is located in Pančevo and was established in 1975 under licence from the former United States based Phillips Petroleum Company. The plant has two production lines and produces high-density polyethylene or HDPE having an annual capacity of 76,000 tonnes. The low-density polyethylene (HDPE) plant is located in Pančevo and was established in 1979 under licence from the former United States based National Distillers. The plant has one production line and produces low-density polyethylene or LDPE having an annual capacity of 57,000 tonnes.

The synthetic rubber plant is located in Elemir and was established in 1983 under licence from the former Germany based Buna-Werke Hulls. The plant has three production units and produces synthetic rubber having an annual capacity of 40,000 tonnes, 1,3-Butadiene under licence from Japanese company Nippon Zeon having an annual production capacity of 45,000 tonnes and methyl tert-butyl ether or MTBE under licence from Italian company Snamprogetti having an annual production capacity of 35,000 tonnes. Other production plants include the PVC production plant in Crepaja with an annual capacity of 16,000 tonnes, the polyethylene pipes and fittings plant in Pančevo with an annual capacity of 11,000 tonnes, the chlorine-alkali electrolysis plant in Pančevo built under the licence of the Olin Corporation with an annual capacity of 200,000 tonnes, a water treatment plant in Pančevo and a utility plant that produces energy fluids.

Market and financial data
In 2017, after years of insolvency, HIP-Petrohemija made record 341.48 million euros of net profit. This tremendous trend turnover was achieved through debt write off and debt-to-shares conversion by the Government of Serbia.

References

External links
 

1968 establishments in Serbia
Companies based in Pančevo
Government-owned companies of Serbia
Non-renewable resource companies established in 1968
HIP Petrohemija
Petrochemical companies
Serbian brands